Lake Hodges is a lake and reservoir located within the city limits of San Diego, California. Lake Hodges has a total capacity of 30,251 acre-feet of water. 
Lake Hodges is owned by the city of San Diego, supplies water to the San Dieguito Water District and Santa Fe Irrigation District, and its mailing city address is Escondido.

The lake level can fluctuate significantly, depending upon the amount of runoff received from the San Dieguito River drainage basin.

Interstate 15 crosses Lake Hodges via the Lake Hodges Bridge.

Lake Hodges Dam
Lake Hodges Dam is a multiple-arch dam that sits on the San Dieguito River. It was commissioned by the Volcan Water Company and designed by John S. Eastwood. It was completed in 1918, and later purchased by the city of San Diego. Water from the Lake Hodges Reservoir services the customers of the Santa Fe Irrigation District and the San Dieguito Water District. The dam is 131 ft tall and 729 ft wide.

In 2005, the San Diego County Water Authority, in conjunction with the City of San Diego, began work on a pipeline to connect Hodges Reservoir with Olivenhain Reservoir. The project was completed in 2012. The connection provides the ability to store  of water at Hodges Reservoir for emergency use.  This system is also used to provide electrical power to the grid during high demand times of the day.  Water is pumped from Lake Hodges to Olivenhain at night when demand (and rates) for electricity is low.  It is then flowed back down through generators during peak demand times.

In 2019 a hypolimnetic aeration system was installed at the site of the former Reservoir keeper's house with a Speece cone installed at the bottom of the lake between that location and Alva canyon.

Following the 2017  Oroville Dam crisis, the state of California conducted spillway inspections on all dams in the state.  Hodges Dam did not pass inspection and, as a result, San Diego Public Utilities Department was ordered to keep the maximum level of the lake 20 feet below the spillway.

Recreation 

Lake Hodges is a popular location for hiking, birding, fishing, kayaking, windsurfing, photography, and picnicking.  It is surrounded by the hiking trails of the San Dieguito River Park and those trails are connected to the park's 65 miles of trails.

The Audubon Society has proclaimed Lake Hodges and vicinity to be a Globally Important Bird Area.  The ability to see almost 200 bird species attracts many birders as well as amateur and professional photographers.

Fishing is allowed 9 months of the year and near record sized Largemouth Bass have been caught in the lake.

Environment 

The riparian habitat around the lake is home to nesting Least Bell's Vireos - an endangered species.  Two other endangered bird species - the California Gnatcatcher and the Cactus Wren - can be found in the land around the lake.

When water levels are up and remain consistent, a large number of Western and Clark's Grebes nest at the shallow eastern end of the lake.  The pumping system can raise and lower the water level in the lake by quite a few inches every day.  These fluctuations can cause floating grebe nests to be grounded, in which case they are abandoned by the parents who cannot get to them.

The city has a volunteer program, managed by Kayaking For The Birds, which has cleared and keeps cleared all available lakeshore of fishing line, fishing tackle, and litter which threaten birds and wildlife.

See also
Lake Hodges Bridge
List of dams and reservoirs in California
List of lakes in California

References

External links
Hodgee, the Lake Hodges Monster, Lake Hodges Scientific Research Center
Hodges Reservoir - City of San Diego

Lake Hodges Projects, via SDCWA.org

Hodges, Lake
United States local public utility dams
Hodges, Lake
Hodges
Geography of San Diego